Indian Indonesians (
) are Indonesians whose ancestors whose ancestors originally came from the Indian subcontinent. Therefore, this term can be regarded as a blanket term for not only Indonesian Indian proper, but also Indonesians with other South Asian ancestry (e.g. Pakistanis, Bangladeshis etc.). According to the Indian Ministry of External Affairs, there were about 120,000 people of Indian origin as well as 9,000 Indian nationals living and working in Indonesia as of January 2012. Most of them were concentrated in province of North Sumatra and urban areas such as Banda Aceh, Surabaya, Medan and Jakarta. However, it is quite impossible to get correct statistical figures on the Indian Indonesian population, because some of them have merged and assimilated with the indigenous population to become indistinguishable from native Indonesians.

History

Various people from the Indian subcontinent have frequented the Indonesian archipelago since the prehistoric era. In Bali, for example, remains of pottery from the first centuries C.E. have been recovered. In fact, the name Indonesia itself comes from the Latin Indus ("India") and Greek nêsos ("island"), which literally means the "Indian archipelago".

From the 4th and 5th centuries onwards, Indian cultural influences became more visible. Initially, Sanskrit was used on inscriptions. However, since the 7th century onward, the Indian scripts were used more often to write down indigenous languages which by now already contained many loan words from Prakrit and Tamil.

In addition to that, indigenous Indonesians began to embrace Hinduism and Buddhism.

It is believed that various Indian people settled in Indonesia, mixed and assimilated with the local population. In an inscription from Central Java in the 9th century, the names of various Indian people (and Southeast Asian people) are mentioned:

ikang warga kilalan kling ārya singhala pandikiri drawiḍa campa kmir... (Brandes 1913:1021).
"the civilians of which one has the use are: people from Kalinga, Aryas, Sinhalese, people from Pandiya, Dravida, Chams, and Khmer..."

Later, with the rise of Islam, this religion was brought to Indonesia by the Indian Muslims from the 11th century onward, first not to replace the existing religious systems, but to complement them.

Recent history

Today migrations of people from India still occur. In Medan, North Sumatra, there is a large (Tamil people) community estimated at 75,000 people (around 75% out of all Indian-Indonesian population). In all of Indonesia, various North Indians are found, but in a very small number. Usually their professions are connected with textile industries. Like Chinese Indonesians, many are shop owners.

Though there are no official figures, it is estimated that there are around 25,000 PIOs/NRIs living in Indonesia, of whom the Indian expatriate community registered with the Embassy and the Consulate in Medan numbers around 75,000.

Indians have been living in Indonesia for centuries, from the time of the Sri Vijaya and Majapahit Empire, both of which were Hindu and heavily influenced by the subcontinent. Indians were later brought to Indonesia by the Dutch in the 19th century as indentured labourers to work on plantations located around Medan in Sumatra. While the majority of these came from South India, a significant number also came from the north. The Medan Indians included Hindus, Muslims and Sikhs. They have now been in Indonesia for over four generations, and hold Indonesian passports. While local statistics continue to suggest that there are some 400 PIOs in Sumatra, the vast majority are now completely assimilated in Indonesian society, though some elements of the Tamil, Sikh and Bihari communities still maintain their cultural traditions.

The Indian Diaspora also includes several thousand Sindhi families who constitute the second wave of Indian immigrants who made Indonesia their home in the first half of the 20th century. The Sindhi community is mainly engaged in trading and commerce.

Among these communities, Tamils and to a lesser extent Sikhs were primarily engaged in agriculture, while Sindhis mainly established themselves in the textile trade and the sports business.

The inflow of major Indian investments in Indonesia starting in the late 1970s drew a fresh wave of Indian investors and managers to this country. This group of entrepreneurs and business professionals has further expanded over the past two decades, and now includes engineers, consultants, chartered accountants, bankers, and other professionals.

The Indian community is very well regarded in Indonesia, is generally prosperous, and includes individuals holding senior positions in local and multinational companies.

Due to economic factors, most traders and businessmen among PIOs have, over the past decades, moved to Jakarta from outlying areas such as Medan and Surabaya. Almost half of the Indian community in Indonesia is now Jakarta-based; it is estimated that the population of Jakarta's Indian community is about 19,000.

There are six main social or professional associations in Jakarta's Indian PIO/NRI community. Gandhi Seva Loka (formerly known as Bombay Merchants Association) is a charitable institution run by the Sindhi community, and is engaged mainly in educational and social activities. Gandhi Memorial International School, Kemoyaran, offers IB curriculum run by the Gandhi Seva Lokha. The India Club is a social organization of PIO/NRI professionals. An Indian Women's Association brings together PIO/NRI spouses and undertakes charitable activities. There is a Gurudwara Prabandhak Committee in Jakarta, and Sindhis as well as Sikhs are associated with Gurudwara activities. The Economic Association of Indonesia and India (ECAII) brings together leading entrepreneurs from the Indian community with the objective of promoting bilateral economic relations, but this group has been largely inactive. Finally, there is the Indonesian chapter of the Institute of Chartered Accountants of India (ICAI).

Tamils have lived in Indonesia since the 1930s. Though predominantly in Medan, Tamil business men have set up various enterprises. Waves of expatriates speaking Tamil language have made Indonesia their home. Indonesia Tamil Manram, a social organisation, is very active In Jakarta, under the able leadership of Mr Sundaraman. It aims to maintain and promote the heritage of Tamil language and culture, create harmony and bridge between Indians and Indonesians through linguistic interests, and provide opportunity for children of expatriates and persons of Indian origin to learn and develop their mother tongue (Tamil).

Indonesian Tamil Manram also teaches the Tamil language to children with Tamil as their mother tongue; conducts programs involving Tamil language and culture; distributes Tamil literature and books to children; organizes Tamil debates, dramas, dance and music programs for local talent; and brings reputable artists from India in the fields of dance, music, drama, and other cultural fields.

Many Indian performers have achieved significant mainstream cultural success. Notable examples are the Punjabi brothers and the Azhari sisters.

Although they are away from India, the Sindhi community and the NRIs in Indonesia have not lost touch with their religious beliefs. Temples, Gurudwaras and prayer halls in Jakarta, Medan and other parts of Indonesia are centers for social gathering. The Shiva temple in Pluit, Jakarta is the center of Indian religious activities. Pluit Perumal is famous, with annual celebrations of brahmotsavam, weekly prayers, and a full-time priest to help devotees offer their prayers. Weekly satsangs, Mahasivarathri and other important days are also celebrated in the Shiva temple. The annual Aiyaapa pooja has been celebrated for over two decades, with devotees offering prayers with fervor. Other temples dedicated to the goddess Devi can be found in Tangerang, Kemayoran and Cikarang in the Jabodetabek region as well as Medan in Sumatra. Another temple is dedicated to Lord Hanuman in the Indorama factory in Jati Luhur, West Jakarta. Gurudwaras in Tanjung Priok, Pasar Baru have been in existence for over five decades, and are visited by people of diverse religions.

Love Medan Indians is a social wing of the Holy Trinity Church, whose primary concerns are education, career building and placement for the less-fortunate Medan Tamils, while emphasizing learning Tamil language, English,  art, music and culture. The group is led by Father Alegesan Moses, known as Pastor Moses Alegesan. He is also the priest at the Holy Trinity Church, an Anglican Indian Community-based church whose goal is to contextualize Christian worship in-line with the rich, authentic, Orthodox relevant Indian fervor, without being syncretistic. He is frequently seen to call and challenge the local Pemko and Pemrovsu to give attention, care and concern to the Medan Indians. Rev. Father Alegesan Moses MA, helped to begin and establish the Trinity Tamil Methodist Church, and its worship sanctuary with a touch of sparkling Indian artistic nuances in Medan, Indonesia, the church is partnership with the Wesley Methodist Church, Gereja Methodist Indonesia(GMI). He played the single most important role in re-establishing the Tamil identity, with various programs promoting the splendor of Indian choreographics through Baratha-Nattyam and encouraging Tabla classes, Tamil Language Classes “நீங்களும் தமிழ் பேசலாம் மற்றும் தமிழ் ஒரு எளிதான மொழி” (Yes you also could speak Tamil, and Tamil is an easy language). He reinstated “Kampung Madras” in Medan, a settlement of Indians, where in the passage of time termed by the locals as “Kampung Keling” a derogatively-insulting slur towards the Indians in Medan. This reinstatement, was consented and approved by His Majesty the Governor of North Sumatera, Sri Lelawangsa  Mr. Haji Syamsul Arifin a Tamil descend whose fore-parents hailed from Karaikal, in Tamil Nadu, and in the present of the Mr. Parlindungan Purba a State Assembly Man representing North Sumatera, as well as Mr. Daermando Purba, the Chief Chair Person of the ministry of Transportation.(2008)

Cuisine

List of notable Indonesian Indians

See also

 Desi
 Klingalese
 Mardijker people
 Non-resident Indian and Overseas Citizen of India
 Tamil diaspora
 African Indonesians
 Arab Indonesians
 Chinese Indonesians
 Indonesian Eurasians
 List of Indonesians

Notes

References

Other sources
J.L.A. Brandes, 1913, Oud-Javaansche oorkonden: nagelaten transscripties van wĳlen J.L.A. Brandes; uitgegeven door N.J. Krom. Batavia: Albrecht. (Old Javanese inscriptions, bequeathed by the late J.L.A. Brandes, edited by N.J. Krom).
Jan Gonda, 1952, Sanskrit in Indonesia. New Delhi: International Academy of Indian Culture.
Page of the Indian Embassy in Jakarta on Indonesia
 Nilay Kothari
 There has never been Indian Kings whose expansion in the South-east Asia known to be of a Sanskrit Speaking. The Raja-raja Chera, Chola, Pandia and the rest of the Kings whose ruler-ship established in this part of the world are of the South Indian Kings.

Ethnic groups in Indonesia
 
Immigration to Indonesia
Indonesia
Tamil diaspora in Asia